The King of Warsaw is Polish crime series directed by Jan P. Matuszyński, based on the novel by Szczepan Twardoch of the same title and produced at the request of Canal+. Its premiere took place on November 6, 2020.

Premise 
Jews and anti-semites. Gangsters and boxers. Street fights and political intrigues. 1937. Warsaw is the arena of power struggles between various political factions. A conspiracy at the height of power may change the face of the capital and the entire Second Polish Republic. The city is shaken by a gang led by a Polish socialist Jan Kaplica. The leader in it is a Jewish boxer Jakub Szapiro who dreams of replacing Kaplica and becoming the king of Warsaw. The specter of fascism hangs over Europe.

Cast

Episodes

Production 

The shooting period lasted from April to October 1, 2019. Locations of the film set: Warsaw, Modlin, Konstancin, Milanówek, Łódź (the intersection of Piotrkowska and Roosevelta streets, the intersection of Żeromskiego and Próchnika streets, the Reicher synagogue).

The plot of the series intertwines both existing and fictional characters, but inspired by real ones. Real politicians from the times of the Second Polish Republic (mainly Sanacja) include Prime Minister Felicjan Sławoj Składkowski, Marshal Edward Śmigły-Rydz and Colonel Adam Koc. Jakub Szapiro is inspired by pre-war light weight boxer Szapsel Rotholc, for some time a leading player of Makabi Warsaw.

See also
 Peaky Blinders (TV series)
 Babylon Berlin

References

External links 

 

Polish television series
2020 Polish television series debuts
2020s crime drama television series
Television shows set in Poland
Television shows set in Warsaw
Polish-language television shows
Television shows based on books
Television series about Jews and Judaism
Yiddish culture in Poland
Canal+ original programming
Boxing television series
Television series about organized crime
1930s in Warsaw
Television series set in 1937
Television shows filmed in Poland
2020s Polish television series
Television series based on actual events
Polish crime television series